The Azerbaijan national under-23 football team represents Azerbaijan in international football competitions and is controlled by the Association of Football Federations of Azerbaijan. The selection is limited to players under the age of 23, except during the Olympic Games where the use of three overage players is allowed.

Honours 
Islamic Solidarity Games
Gold Medalists (1): 2017
Bronze Medalists (1): 2021

Players

Current squad
The following 23 players were called up for the 2017 Islamic Solidarity Games in Azerbaijan. Ruslan Abışov, Rashad Sadiqov and Aghabala Ramazanov  were the three over-aged players selected to play in the games.

Caps and goals as of May 21, 2017 after the match against Oman.

See also
Azerbaijan national football team
Azerbaijan national under-21 football team
Azerbaijan national under-20 football team
Azerbaijan national under-19 football team
Azerbaijan national under-18 football team
Azerbaijan national under-17 football team
Association of Football Federations of Azerbaijan
Azerbaijan Premier League

References

External links
Azerbaycan Futbol Federasiyaları Assosiasiyası

 
European national under-23 association football teams
Football in Azerbaijan